La Douay railway station is a railway station in the municipality of Orsières, in the Swiss canton of Valais. It is located on the standard gauge Martigny–Orsières line of Transports de Martigny et Régions.

Services 
 the following services stop at La Douay:

References

External links 
 
 

Railway stations in the canton of Valais
Transports de Martigny et Régions stations